Wincanton ( or ) is a small town and electoral ward in South Somerset, southwest England. The town lies off the A303 road, a main route between London and South West England, and has some light industry. The town and electoral ward has a population of 5,272.

History
Windmill Hill was the site of a Bronze Age Beaker culture burial, and contemporary artefacts have been found on the Selwood Ridge.

Prior to the Norman Conquest Wincanton was frequently the scene of battles between the Britons, Danes and Saxons. During the reign of Edmund Ironside, the English, under his command, defeated the Danes, forcing them to leave England.

In the Domesday Book the name of the town was spelled as "Wincaleton", thought to mean "Pleasant town on the Cale". Cockroad Wood Castle, which is now in the parish of Charlton Musgrove, was a motte and bailey castle, probably built after the Norman conquest of England of 1066. The castle sits close to the contemporary Norman castles of Ballands and Castle Orchard, and may have been built as part of a system of fortifications to control the surrounding area. By 1086 the surrounding land was held by Walter of Douai, although no documentary evidence of the castle remains.

The parish of Wincanton was part of the Norton Ferris Hundred.

Wincanton was probably the site of a market in the medieval period but did not gain a market and fair charter until 1556.

The town was the scene of one of the few armed skirmishes in England during the Revolution of 1688. In the Wincanton Skirmish a troop of Horse Guards under Patrick Sarsfield, loyal to James II, defeated an advance party of troops fighting for William of Orange, on 20 November 1688. A great part of the town was destroyed by fires in the years 1707 and 1747.

In the early 19th century Wincanton was a depot for French officers, during the Napoleonic Wars.

By 2010 there had been an influx of foreign nationals, especially Portuguese and Polish citizens.

Governance

Wincanton is within the area of Somerset County Council and the Non-metropolitan district of South Somerset, with its own town council. The town council has responsibility for local issues, including setting an annual precept (local rate) to cover the council's operating costs and producing annual accounts for public scrutiny. The town council evaluates local planning applications and works with the local police, district council officers, and neighbourhood watch groups on matters of crime, security, and traffic; their role also includes initiating projects for the maintenance and repair of parish facilities, as well as consulting with the district council on the maintenance, repair, and improvement of highways, drainage, footpaths, public transport, and street cleaning. Conservation matters (including trees and listed buildings) and environmental issues are also the responsibility of the council.

The South Somerset district council is responsible for local planning and building control, local roads, council housing, environmental health, markets and fairs, refuse collection and recycling, cemeteries and crematoria, leisure services, parks, and tourism. Somerset County Council is responsible for running the largest and most expensive local services such as education, social services, the library, roads, public transport, trading standards and waste disposal.

It is part of Somerton and Frome, a constituency of the House of Commons. The current member of parliament is the conservative politician David Warburton. Prior to Brexit in 2020, residents of Wincanton also formed part of the electorate for the South West England constituency for elections to the European Parliament.

Services

Wincanton Community Hospital in Dancing Lane was formerly known as Verrington Hospital and in March 2015 had 28 beds on two wards plus intermediate care unit. It opened as an Isolation Hospital in September 1910 for patients with scarlet fever.

The Balsam Centre is a Healthy Living Centre and also a Children's Centre for Wincanton and South East Somerset.

The (War) Memorial Hall, which opened on 9 January 1959, has a stage as well as facilities for dancing or for seating 250. It also has a separate committee room that can seat 50.

Fire, police and ambulance services are provided jointly with other authorities through the Devon and Somerset Fire and Rescue Service, Avon and Somerset Constabulary and the South Western Ambulance Service.

Geography

Climate
Along with the rest of South West England, Wincanton has a temperate climate which is generally wetter and milder than the rest of the country.

The southwest of England has a favoured location with respect to the Azores high pressure when it extends its influence northeastwards towards the UK, particularly in summer. Convective cloud often forms inland however, especially near hills, reducing the number of hours of sunshine. The average annual sunshine totals around 1,600 hours.

Rainfall tends to be associated with Atlantic depressions or with convection. The Atlantic depressions are more vigorous in autumn and winter and most of the rain which falls in those seasons in the southwest is from this source. November to March have the highest mean wind speeds, with June to August having the lightest winds. The predominant wind direction is from the southwest.

Economy
In the late 1890s the West Surrey Central Dairy Company purchased a local creamery. In 1908, after developing a dried milk baby powder, it changed its name to Cow & Gate. The creamery and dairy products factory had its own sidings from the Somerset and Dorset Joint Railway station, providing access for milk trains.

In order to cope with the transport problems across its quickly expanding creamery, milk bottling and doorstep delivery network, Cow & Gate formed a dedicated logistics arm in 1920. Spun out in 2002 from successor company Unigate, Wincanton PLC is the UK's second largest logistics company. The company still has a dairy products base in the town, although its head office function moved to Chippenham, Wiltshire in 2005.

In 1999, Unigate sold its remaining dairies to Dairy Crest, which still has a creamery and milk processing plant in the town, but has sold the cheese business to Adams Foods Ltd., producer of the Pilgrim's Choice brand of Cheddar cheese, in 2010 the second best selling brand in the UK.

Several award-winning businesses are located in Wincanton, such as Coffee Sense Coffee Roasters who won a Guild of Fine Food Great Taste Award Winner in 2017 and Boxclever Press Ltd who gained Royal recognition in 2019 when they were awarded a Queen's Award for Enterprise in the International Trade category

Landmarks

The Dogs (also called The Old House) was built around 1650, and was reshaped internally by Nathaniel Ireson in 1740–50. It is a grade I listed building.

Transport

The town had a railway station on the Somerset and Dorset Joint Railway but this closed on 7 March 1966.

The town is north of the A303 road, one of the main routes between London and South West England.

The nearest railway stations are in neighbouring Templecombe railway station on the Exeter to Waterloo line, and Castle Cary railway station on the Reading to Taunton and Heart of Wessex lines.

The town is served twice daily by Berrys Coaches 'Superfast' service to and from London.

Education

Primary education up to the age of 11 is offered by Wincanton Primary School and Our Lady of Mount Carmel Catholic Primary School.
The history of Wincanton Primary began in 1833 when an appeal was launched to provide a National school in Wincanton and after a number of difficulties the school was built in North Street in 1838, although this had very few pupils. A school board was formed in 1871 and opened a school in the former National school buildings with over 200 pupils. In 1875 there were 206 children attending. In 1894 the board raised money for a new school to accommodate 445 children, which opened in South Street in 1897.

Wincanton has one secondary school, King Arthur's School, which is Somerset's first specialist Sports College.

The Balsam Centre is a Healthy Living Centre and also a Children's Centre. Since 2005 it has received grants for the re-fitting of the training kitchen and construction and refurbishment to create a dedicated teaching area, counselling and interview rooms and a studio space for physical and community activities.

Religious sites

The Church of St Peter and St Paul was almost totally rebuilt in 1887-91 by J. D. Sedding; however, parts of the tower may be remnants of an earlier church, dating from 1313, on the same site. The additional carving and north porch were added in subsequent years. The churchyard includes a self-designed monument to the local architect Nathaniel Ireson who died in 1796. Because of the state of the roofs, which are under repair, the church is included on the Heritage at Risk Register.

The Roman Catholic Church and Presbytery of St Luke and St Teresa was built in 1881 by the priest/architect A.J.C Scoles.

There are also places of worship for Pentecostals, Methodists, Baptists and Quakers in the town.

Culture

Wincanton Museum is a small local museum in the High Street which closed in 2010. You can now visit some of the items which were in the museum in the library which is situated in Carrington Way.

The cartoonist Tony Weare was born in Wincanton.

Sports

The town gives its name to Wincanton Racecourse which is in the neighbouring parish of Charlton Musgrove.

Wincanton has a Non-League football club Wincanton Town F.C. who play at the Wincanton Sports Ground on Moor Lane. The Sports Ground in Moor Lane also provides facilities for tennis and bowls.

Wincanton Sports Centre was opened in 2001, funded by a National Lottery grant.

The cricket club, which plays in the recreation ground, has two Saturday teams and a Sunday team.

The rugby union club plays at King Arthur's Community School in the town. In 2010 they won the Dorset & Wilts division of the English Rugby Union South West Division.

Wincanton Cycling Club was founded in and regularly carries out group rides.

The Wrong Way Back (TWWB) is a charity cycle event first held in 2010. The event starts and finishes in Wincanton and takes the riders 8 days to complete the 561-mile route.

Twinning
Wincanton is unusual in that it was twinned in 2002 with a town which can only be found in fiction. As well as with Gennes / Les Rosiers in France and Lahnau in Germany, Wincanton is twinned with Ankh-Morpork, a fictional city state near the Circle Sea on Terry Pratchett's Discworld. On 5 April 2009, a number of roads on a new housing development were given names taken from Ankh-Morpork, such as Peach Pie Street and Treacle Mine Road, after a short-list was voted upon by fans. There are shops in the town selling Discworld-related goods. In 2015 the Uncle Tom's Cabin pub unveiled a sign by Discworld illustrator Richard Kingston referencing The Mended Drum. Pratchett and Kingston were regulars. The other Pratchett connection is to be found in Cale Park. A new bridge was built over the River Cale from the main park to the Children's recreation area. The name 'Troll Bridge' was chosen by the public from a list of nominations. This refers to a short story written by Terry Pratchett and a short film of the same name made by Snowgum Films.

References

External links

 
Towns in South Somerset
Civil parishes in Somerset
Market towns in Somerset